Hodan District is a district in the southeastern Banaadir region of Somalia. It is a neighborhood in the northwestern part of Mogadishu.

History
On October 14, 2017, there were two truck bombings in the Hodan District, which killed at least 587 people in total and destroyed a hotel.

References

Districts of Somalia
Administrative map of Hodan District

Gadudow house 
Districts of Somalia
Banaadir